Selvaggi is an Italian surname. Notable people with the surname include:

Franco Selvaggi (born 1953), Italian footballer
Mirko Selvaggi (born 1985), Italian cyclist
Rito Selvaggi (1898–1972), Italian composer

Italian-language surnames